Evan McDonald Whidden (9 July 1898 - 11 March 1980) was a Canadian Christian minister and academic whose career included being President of Brandon College, Dean of Theology at Acadia University, and chairman of the founding conference of the Atlantic Ecumenical Council. An annual scholarship is awarded at Acadia University in his honor.

He was the son of Howard Primrose and Katherine Louise (Ganong) Whidden, and married Frances Margaret Billington in 1941.

Evan was listed in the Canadian Who’s Who in 1951.

Evan and Frances had three children: Howard John born 22 June 1943, Roberta "Robie" Katherine born 13 March 1945 who resided in San Francisco, California and Eric Christopher born 5 March 1947 who resides in Orlando, Florida.  They also had four granddaughters: Elinor Whidden (b.1976), Margaret Whidden (b.1978), Erica Whidden (b.1978) and Hilary Whidden (b.1980).

Career

1915-1918 World War I, CFA, CEF, France
1921 educated in Brandon College, Brandon, Manitoba BA
1921 Reabow, Ontario
1921-1933 Tabernacle Church, Winnipeg, Manitoba
1925 McMaster University, Toronto, Ontario MA
1925 Palmerston, Ontario
1928 Yale Divinity School, New Haven, Connecticut, BD
1928-1935 student pastorates, east end, Saskatoon, Saskatchewan
1934 General Ministry Association, Winnipeg, Manitoba
1935-1936 Edinburgh University, Edinburgh, Scotland
1936 professor of theology and head of department, Brandon College, Brandon, Manitoba, where he was college president for a time
circa 1951 Dean of Theology, Acadia University, Wolfville, Nova Scotia; retired 1967.

Books
Evan was the author of:

References

Whidden, Evan McDonald
Whidden, Evan McDonald
Ganong family
Canadian Christian religious leaders
Academic staff of Acadia University
Canadian military personnel of World War I
Yale Divinity School alumni